"Brown Eyes Baby" is a song recorded and co-produced by New Zealand-born Australian-American country music artist Keith Urban. The song was written by fellow country music artist Morgan Wallen alongside Josh Thompson, Rodney Clawson, and Will Bundy. It is the third single off Urban's upcoming twelfth studio album.

Background and release
Urban stated that upon hearing "Brown Eyes Baby" in January of 2022, he had a "visceral reaction," and "just loved it." He remarked, "Once I heard it a lot more, I realized it’s everything: it’s the lyric, it’s the melody, it’s the way the song is written. It just connected. It made a connection with me." He was unaware of who had written the song until after he had decided to record it, as the original demo was sung by Josh Thompson.

Urban previewed a clip of a live performance of the song from his tour on social media on June 29, 2022. It was released to digital and streaming platforms as well as country radio on July 8, 2022. Morgan Wallen took to Instagram to thank Urban for "doing [his] thing" with the song, adding that he was "proud to be a part of writing it."

Critical reception
Billy Dukes of Taste of Country reviewed the song favourably, calling it a "vocal and lyrical showcase." He added that the "right song found the right singer," noting how Urban's "sensitive touch" and " electric guitar" steered the song in the right direction. An uncredited review from 101.3 Real Country noted a similar subject matter to Urban's 2016 hit "Blue Ain't Your Color", adding that the song's "melody features a smooth, sway-a-long groove that’s a perfect fit for a live show. Buddy Iahn of The Music Universe stated that the song has a "beautiful, melodic chorus and a signature Urban guitar hook."

Live performance
Urban debuted "Brown Eyes Baby" live on the opening night of his "The Speed of Now World Tour" in the spring of 2022. On June 30, 2022, Urban performed the song live from the Rockefeller Center in New York City. He also performed it on NBC's Today Show that day. In November 2022, he performed the song on ABC's Good Morning America program.

Track listings
Digital download – single
 "Brown Eyes Baby" – 3:45

Cassette – single
 "Brown Eyes Baby" – 3:45
 "Wild Hearts – 3:02

Personnel
Adapted from the cassette booklet.

 Adam Ayan – mastering
 Drew Bollman – mixing assistance
 Matt Chamberlain – drums
 Dann Huff – production, electric guitar, programming
 David Huff – programming
 Scott Johnson – production coordinator
 Charlie Judge – Hammond B-3 organ, synthesizer
 Zach Kuhlman – recording assistance
 Buckley Miller – recording
 Justin Niebank – mixing, programming
 Josh Reedy – background vocals
 Jimmy Lee Sloas – bass guitar
 Keith Urban – lead vocals, background vocals, banjo, electric guitar, production

Charts

References

2022 singles
2022 songs
Keith Urban songs
Songs written by Rodney Clawson
Songs written by Josh Thompson (singer)
Songs written by Morgan Wallen
Song recordings produced by Dann Huff
Capitol Records Nashville singles